Garryowen Football Club (Irish: Cumann Rugbaí Gharraí Eoin), usually referred to as Garryowen, is a rugby union club from Limerick, Ireland. It plays in Division 1A of the All-Ireland League and historically has been one of the most successful clubs in Irish rugby union.

History
The club was formed in 1884. The founding members of the club were:
 President W.L. Stokes
 Secretary J. Gogarty
 Treasurer M. L. Joyce
 Captain J.O'Sullivan
 Messrs, Patrick Stapleton, Tom Prendergast, J.O'Connor, J.G.O'Brien, Roche, Riordan, Pender, Gilligan and Dick
Founding member of the club, W.L.Stokes, had a huge influence on the game in Limerick during the 1880s. He made sure Garryowen received Union recognition in 1884. If not for his tireless work promoting rugby, Garryowen might never have begun.

Another great family linked to Garryowen were the O'Connors. John O'Connor was a founder member of the club and his seven sons were prominent rugby players, runners and oarsmen of national and international renown. They won 47 Munster senior cup medals between them beginning in the early 1890s. Born in Athlunkard Street, Limerick, the seven brothers - Mick, Charlie, Jack, Thade, Joe, Bryan and Jim - set an impressive record with 47 medals. Jack with 11 had the most. His son, Mick, won 4 further Munster Senior Cup medals between 1925 and 1934.

The club has had two fixed homes. The Markets Field until 1957 then the club moved to Dooradoyle. After the club moved, Garryowen which had won the Senior cup in 1954 did not achieve success again for 15 years. This was the longest period in the club's history without a cup win. It was not till 1969 that another led to a glorious period for the club with probably the finest collection of players since the great nine in row team. With 5 senior cups coming in the next 10 years. There was also great success on the international scene with 6 players getting capped for Ireland in this time.

After winning the Cup in 1979 the club did not achieve Cup success again until 1993, not the largest gap between wins but this was the 1st time that they had failed to win at least one cup in each decade. Back-to-back Munster Senior League successes in 1982 and 1983 were the highlights of the 80's. The foundations were laid for the great success that was achieved in the 90's. The advent of the All Ireland League would give the club game in Limerick the platform it had long sought.

Having won the league title in its second and fourth year (1992, 1994), Garryowen reached two finals and a number of semi-finals only to fall just short. However, 2007 proved a spectacular year for the Limerick side, seeing them finally re-take the AIL crown after their years of disappointment and also the Munster Senior and AIL cups in what is an unprecedented clean sweep of all domestic competitions in Irish club rugby.

In total Garryowen have won the Munster Senior Cup  38 times, more times than any other club. Garryowen won the trophy nine times in a row between 1889 and 1898 and have the distinction of having played in the first final in 1886 and the 100th final in 1986.

The garryowen kick
In playing terms a  garryowen is a very high up and under kick (named after the rugby club) designed to put the opposing team under pressure, by allowing the kicking team time to arrive under and compete for the high ball. It is thought to have come part of the modern lexicon in the early 1920s as one of the great Garryowen teams that won three Senior cups from 1924 to 1926 used this tactic to the utmost.

Honours
All-Ireland League (3):
 1992, 1994, 2007
All-Ireland Cup (3)
2006–07, 2011–12, 2018–19
Munster Senior Cup (39):
 1889, 1890, 1891, 1892, 1893, 1894, 1895, 1896, 1898, 1899, 1902, 1903, 1904, 1908, 1909, 1911, 1914, 1920, 1924,  1925, 1926, 1932, 1934, 1940, 1947, 1952, 1954, 1969, 1971, 1974, 1975, 1979, 1993, 1995, 1997, 1999, 2007, 2012, 2018
Munster Senior League (17):
 1903, 1904, 1905,  1906, 1907, 1908, 1909, 1910, 1911, 1912, 1925, 1936, 1946, 1954, 1982, 1983, 2001
 Munster Junior Cup (7):
 1910, 1955, 1970, 1976, 1978, 1993, 2007

Notable players
See also

Ireland
The following Garryowen players have represented Ireland at full international level, 56 players in total. The club has had players represent Ireland at every position.

 Michael Sherry, 1 Cap, 2014 (USA) to present
 Conor Murray, 100 Caps, 2011 (Fra) to present
 Damien Varley, 3 Caps, 2010 (Aus) to present
 Rob Henderson 32 Caps, 1996 (Samoa) to 2003 (Italy)
 Paul Burke, 13 Caps, 1995 (Eng) to 2003 (Samoa)
 Jeremy Staunton, 5 Caps, 2001 (Samoa) to present
 David Wallace 72 Caps, 2000 (Arg) to 2011 (Eng), Member of the 2009 Grand Slam winning team
 Tom Tierney, 8 Caps, 1999 (Aus) to 2000 (Eng)
 Killian Keane, 1 Cap, 1998 (E)
 Dominic Crotty, 5 Caps, 1996 (A) to 2000 (Canada)
 Stephen McIvor, 3 caps, 1996 (A), 1997 (It,S)
 Ben Cronin, 2 Caps, 1995 (S), 1997 (S)
 Keith Wood, 58 Caps, 1994 (Aus)-2003 (France)
 Richard Costello, 1 Cap, 1993 (S)
 Paul Hogan, 1 Cap, 1992 (F)
 Neville Furlong, 2 Caps, 1992 (NZ)
 Nicky Barry, 1 Cap, 1991 (Namibia)
 Richard Wallace, 29 Caps 1991 (Nm), 1998 (E)
 Philip Danaher, 28 Caps (also played with Lansdowne) 1988 (Scot) to 1995 (Wales)
 Willie Sexton, 4 Caps, 1984 (A), 1988 (S,E,E)
 Tony Ward 19 Caps (also played with St Marys), 1978 (S,F,W,E,NZ), 1979 (F,W,E,S), 1981 (W,E,S,A), 1983 (E), 1984 (E,S), 1986 (S), 1987 (C,Tg)
 Pat C. Whelan, 19 Caps
 Larry A.Moloney, 4 Caps, 1976 (W,S), 1978 (S,NZ)
 Michael J.Sherry, 2 Caps (also played with UCD) 1975 (F,W)
 Seamus Dennison, 3 Caps, 1975 (F), 1975 (E,S)
 Shay Deering (Jr.) 8 Caps (also played with St Marys) 1974 (W), 1976 (F,W,E,S), 1977 (W,E), 1978 (NZ)
 Johnny C.Moroney], 6 Caps, 1968 (W,A), 1969 (F,E,S,W)
 Mick Doyle, 20 Caps (also played for Blackrock & UCD), 1965 (F,E,S,W,SA), 1966 (F,E,S,W), 1967 (A1,E,S,W,F,A2), 1968 (F,E,S,W,A)
 J.C.Kelly, 11 Caps (also played with UCD), 1962 (F,W), 1963 (F,E,S,W,NZ), 1964 (E,S,W,F)
 Tom J.Nesdale, 1 Cap, 1961 (F)
 Noel Murphy 49 Caps, 1958 (Aus)-69 (Wales)
 Tim McGrath, 7 Caps, 1956 (W), 1958 (F), 1960 (E,S,W,F), 1961 (SA)
 Gordon Wood 29 Caps, 1954 (E,S), 1956 (F,E,S,W), 1957 (F,E,S,W), 1958 (A,E,S,W,F), 1959 (E,S,W,F), 1960 (E,S,W,F,SA), 1961 (E,S,W,F,SA)
 Tom E. Reid, 13 Caps, 1953 (E,S,W), 1954 (NZ,F), 1955 (E,S), 1956 (F,E), 1957 (F,E,S,W)
 Aengus D. McMorrow, 1 Cap, 1951 (W)
 Hugh Delacy, 2 Caps, 1948 (E,S)
 Paddy Reid, 4 Caps, 1947 (A), 1948 (F,E,W), Member of Ireland's first Grand Slam winning team
 Dave B. O'Loughlin, 6 Caps (also played with UCC), 1938 (E,S,W), 1939 (E,S,W)
 Shay M.Deering, 9 Caps (also played with Bective Rangers), 1935 (E,S,W,NZ), 1936 (E,S,W), 1937 (E,S)
 D.G.Langan, 1 Cap (also played with Clontarf), 1934 (W)
 Anthony Sheehan, 1 Cap (also played with Munster), 1927 (S)
 Dr. A.W. Courtenay, 7 Caps, 1920 (S,W,F), 1921 (E,S,W,F)
 Noel Butler, 1 Cap (also played with Bective Rangers & Young Munster), 1920 (E)
 Dr.P.J. Stokes, 12 Caps, 1913 (E,S), 1914 (F), 1920 (E,S,W,F), 1921 (E,S,F), 1922 (W,F)
 J.J. Clune, 6 Caps (also played with Blackrock Coll), 1912 (SA), 1913 (W,F), 1914 (F,E,W)
 G.V. Killeen, 10 Caps, 1912 (E,S,W), 1913 (E,S,W,F), 1914 (E,S,W)
 R.V. Jackson, 10 Caps (also played with Wanderers), 1911 (E,S,W,F), 1913 (W,F), 1914 (F,E,S,W)
 Joe J. O'Connor, 1 Cap, 1909 (F)
 T. Halpin, 13 Caps, 1909 (S,W,F), 1910 (E,S,W), 1911 (E,S,W,F), 1912 (F,E,S)
 G.J. Henebry, 6 Caps, 1906 (E,S,W,SA), 1909 (W,F)
 Pa Healy, 11 Caps, 1901 (E,S,W), 1902 (E,S,W), 1903 (E,S,W), 1904 (S)
 Jack O'Connor, 1 Cap, 1895 (S)
 Michael S.Egan, 2 Caps, 1893 (E), 1895 (S)
 T.F. Peel, 3 Caps, 1892 (E,S,W)
 George Collopy, 2 Caps (also played for Bective Rangers), 1891 (S), 1892 (S)
 T. Fogarty, 1 Cap, 1891 (W)
 Jack Macauley, 2 Caps, 1887 (E,S)
 J.M. O'Sullivan, 2 Caps, 1884 (S), 1887 (S)

British & Irish Lions
The following Garryowen players have also represented the British & Irish Lions.

 Conor Murray: 2013, 2017 played in 5 tests.
 David Wallace: 2001, 2009, played in 3 tests.
 Rob Henderson, 2001, played in 3 tests.
 Keith Wood: 1997, 2001, played in 5 tests.
 Richard Wallace, 1993, played in 0 tests.
 Tony Ward: 1980, played in 1 test.
 Mick Doyle, 1968, played in 1 test.
 Noel Murphy: 1959, 1966, played in 8 tests.
 Gordon Wood: 1959, played in 2 tests.
 Tom Reid, 1955, played in 2 tests.

Captains of Ireland
 Keith Wood,
 Philip Danaher

Former presidents of the IRFU
 J.Macauley,
 J.M.O'Sullivan,
 D.G.O'Donovan,
 K.J.Quilligan,
 J.Quilligan

Other notables
 Eddie O'Sullivan, Coach of Ireland 2001-2008

2018/19 Squad
Full-backs: Andrew O'Byrne, Jamie Heuston
Wings: Alex Wootton, Liam Coombes, Cian O'Shea, Ronan O'Mahony, Dan Hurley, John Hurley
Centres: Peadar Collins, Dave McCarthy, Bryan Fitzgerald, Matt More, Sammy Arnold
Out-halves: Jamie Gavin, Bill Johnston, Ben Healy, Ben Swindlehurst
Scrum-halves: Neil Cronin, Rob Guerin, Ed Barry, Evan Maher, Steven Atkinson
Front-rows: Niall Horan, Mike O'Donnell, Andrew Keating, Ben Rowley, Jack Mullany, Jeremy Loughman
Hookers: Liam Cronin, Diarmuid Barron, David Canny
Second-rows: Scott Leahy, Dean Moore, Kevin Seymour, Roy Whelan, Seán O'Connor
Back Rows: Tim Ferguson, Conor Oliver, Jack Daly, Darren Ryan, Alan Fitzgerald, Sean Rennison, Mikey Wilson

References

External links
Garryowen FC's official website
League tables

 
Rugby clubs established in 1884
Irish rugby union teams
Rugby union clubs in County Limerick
Senior Irish rugby clubs (Munster)